María Pujol (died 8 January 1767), also known as La Napa, was a Catalonian alleged witch.   She was the last person to be executed for witchcraft in Catalonia and Spain.

Life
She was a poor woman residing in Prats de Llusanés, who were accused by her neighbors to rob orchards and farms for food. 

In 1766, the body of a murdered four year old girl was found, and her neighbors accused her of having murdered the girl to use her body parts to manufacture magical potions. 

She was charged with sorcery in Barcelona. This was a century after the witch trials of Spain had died out. She was sentenced as guilty by a secular court to hanging for witchcraft. Her execution took place on 8 January 1767.

Legacy
Known as the last person to be executed for witchcraft in her country, she is the subject of local folklore and legend in Catalonia.

References

 AADD, El Lluçanès màgic. Recull de llegendes i rondalles del Lluçanès, Edicions Cossetània i Ajuntament de Sant Boi de Lluçanès, 1998.
 GORCHS, A., Prats de Lluçanès, 905-2005. Cronologia de 1.100 anys d'història, Ajuntament de Prats de Lluçanès, 2006.

Witch trials in Spain
People executed for witchcraft
1767 deaths
18th-century Spanish people
18th-century Spanish women
18th-century executions by Spain